The FAMAS Award for Best Director is one of the major FAMAS Awards, given to the film director who has shown great artistic instincts, choices and excellence in assembling his or her motion picture. The FAMAS Best Director is chosen from the Filipino films shown in the previous calendar year that were screened by the FAMAS. As of the 55th FAMAS Awards, four women have picked up the award, namely Fely Crisostomo, Marilou Diaz-Abaya, Laurice Guillen and Lupita Aquino (Kashiwahara); and twenty-six men.

Winners and nominees
The list may be incomplete such as some of the names of the nominees especially during the early years of FAMAS Awards.

1950s

1960s

1970s

1980s

1990s

2000s

2010s

2020s

Superlatives

External links
 FAMAS

References

Director